Jean-Michel André Jarre (born 24 August 1948) is a French composer, performer and record producer. He is a pioneer in the electronic, ambient and new-age genres, and is known for organising outdoor spectacles featuring his music, accompanied by vast laser displays, large projections and fireworks.

Jarre was raised in Lyon by his mother and grandparents and trained on the piano. From an early age, he was introduced to a variety of art forms, including street performers, jazz musicians and the artist Pierre Soulages. But his musical style was perhaps most heavily influenced by Pierre Schaeffer, a pioneer of musique concrète at the Groupe de Recherches Musicales.

His first mainstream success was the 1976 album Oxygène. Recorded in a makeshift studio at his home, the album sold an estimated 18 million copies. Oxygène was followed in 1978 by Équinoxe, and in 1979, Jarre performed to a record-breaking audience of more than a million people at the Place de la Concorde, a record he has since broken three times. More albums were to follow, but his 1979 concert served as a blueprint for his future performances around the world. Several of his albums have been released to coincide with large-scale outdoor events.

He was the first Western musician officially invited to perform in the People's Republic of China and holds the world record for the largest-ever audience at an outdoor event for his Moscow concert on 6 September 1997, which was attended by 3.5 million people.

1970s

1980s

1990s

2000s

2010s

2020s

References

Bibliography

External links 
 Concert pictures on the official jarre photobase
 List of Jean Michel Jarre concerts

Lists of concert tours